Devil's Pitchfork can refer to:

The Blivet, also known as the Devil's tuning fork, an impossible object and optical illusion
Bidens frondosa, an herb native to North America
The Twin lead of TV antennas, as well as video game RF switches.